Gary John Costello (1952–2006) was an Australian jazz double bass player. He was a member of Paul Grabowsky Trio, which won the ARIA Award for Best Jazz Album in 1990 and 1996. He died aged, 54, after a heart attack.

Discography

Barry Duggan, Allan Browne, Gary Costello
L'Etranger (1997) - Newmarket

Gary Norman/Gary Costello
Bebop Bros (2006) - Newmarket

See also
 Paul Grabowsky Trio

References

Australian musicians
Australian jazz composers
Male jazz composers
20th-century Australian musicians
20th-century Australian male musicians
2006 deaths
1952 births
Paul Grabowsky Trio members
20th-century jazz composers